Lawrence High School (abbreviated as LHS) is a public secondary school located in Lawrence, Massachusetts, United States. It is part of the Lawrence Public Schools district. Its current campus consists of several buildings and was completed 2005.

Campus History 
In 1901, The Lawrence High School was established at the corner of Lawrence and Haverhill street. This is where Lawrence High School served its many students for 106 years. In 2007, a new Lawrence High School campus opened in south Lawrence. The original building houses an alternative high school program, and a public middle school. The new Lawrence High School Campus is organized into academies by grade level, with a 9th Grade Academy, a 10th Grade Academy, and an Upper School Academy which serves 11th graders and 12 graders. The new Lawrence High School Campus also houses the Abbott Lawrence Academy, which serves the highest-performing students and the LIFE program, which serves students who are differently-abled. The new Lawrence High School Campus is one of the largest in the state, with a Field House that can seat 3,400 individuals and a Performing Arts Center that seats an extra 1,200 individuals.

Due to poor academic performance, the school and district received public criticism in 2012.

Demographics

Receivership
In 2010, more than one out of every four students at LHS dropped out and only 35 percent of 10th graders were assessed to be proficient in mathematics, according to Massachusetts Department of Elementary and Secondary Education standardized testing results.  As a result, the school district was put under receivership by the state Board of Education in January 2012. The receiver named was Jeffrey Riley.  In 2012, the drop out rate at the high school was more than 50%.

Controversies

6 fights break out at Lawrence High School; extra police assigned 
In October 2021, multiple fights were reported in one day. Several fights were caught on film and a teacher was injured due to an altercation.

4 Minors, Mother Arrested in Fight Near Lawrence High School, Police Say 
In October 2021, a fight occurred after school dismissal which resulted in 4 minors and an adult to be arrested. Some of the altercation was caught on video.

References

External links
State Takeover Gives Mass. District a Fresh Start

Public high schools in Massachusetts
Schools in Essex County, Massachusetts
Educational institutions established in 1901
1901 establishments in Massachusetts
Lawrence, Massachusetts